Moussobadougou (also known as Ouassadougou) is a village in central Ivory Coast. It is in the sub-prefecture of Bonguéra, M'Bahiakro Department, Iffou Region, Lacs District.

Moussobadougou was a commune until March 2012, when it became one of 1126 communes nationwide that were abolished.

Notes

Former communes of Ivory Coast
Populated places in Lacs District
Populated places in Iffou